The Challenger de Tigre is a professional tennis tournament played on clay courts. It is currently part of the ATP Challenger Tour. It is held annually in Tigre, Argentina since 2022.

Past finals

Singles

Doubles

References

ATP Challenger Tour
Clay court tennis tournaments
Tennis tournaments in Argentina
Recurring sporting events established in 2022